= North Bluff =

Coordinates: 44°19′19″N 90°10′55″W

North Bluff is a summit in the U.S. state of Wisconsin. The elevation is 1,152 feet (351 m).

North Bluff was so named on account of its location relative to nearby South Bluff.
