= South Bluff =

Coordinates: 44°16′26″N 90°12′44″W

South Bluff is a summit in the U.S. state of Wisconsin. The elevation is 1,096 feet (334 m).

South Bluff was so named on account of its location relative to nearby North Bluff.
